Soto la Marina Municipality is one of the municipalities of Tamaulipas. The seat is at Soto la Marina, Tamaulipas.

Municipalities of Tamaulipas